Daryl A. Powell (born 21 July 1965) is an English professional rugby league coach who is the head coach of the Warrington Wolves in the Super League.

He played for Sheffield Eagles, Keighley Cougars  and Leeds Rhinos, as well as Balmain Tigers and Gold Coast Seagulls in Australia. He played more than 450 games including 33 caps for Great Britain, and made appearances in the Super League Grand Final and in two Challenge Cup Finals for the Leeds Rhinos. At Sheffield he formed a key partnership with Mark Aston, and holds the club record for the most individual tries in a match (5) and he did hold the record for most career tries (114) until this was broken by Menzie Yere in 2013.

Background
Powell was born in Ackworth, Wakefield, West Riding of Yorkshire, England.

Playing career
Powell was selected to go on the 1992 Great Britain Lions tour of Australia and New Zealand. His Testimonial match at Sheffield Eagles took place in 1994. He played for England in the 1995 Rugby League World Cup.

Leeds Rhinos
Powell played for Leeds at stand-off half in their 1998 Super League Grand Final loss to Wigan. He was a member of the Rhinos' 1999 Challenge Cup winning team. He played stand-off in the final as the Rhinos beat London Broncos 52–16 to claim their first silverware since 1978.

Coaching career

Keighley Cougars
Powell's first coaching appointment was as player/coach at Keighley where he was appointed at the end of the 1996 season. He was in charge for 24 games before his transfer to Leeds at the end of June 1997 although his tenure as coach at Keighley continued until July 1997. Under his leadership Keighley won 14, lost 9 and drew 1 game.

Leeds Rhinos
After he retired from playing in 2001, he became coach of Leeds Rhinos. The Rhinos appeared to be on an upward trajectory under Powell, finishing 5th then 4th in his first two seasons.

In his third season in charge, the club reached the 2003 Challenge Cup Final but lost 22–20 to Bradford Bulls. Trailing by 2 points with 5 minutes remaining, the Rhinos were awarded a penalty. Captain Kevin Sinfield famously opted not to take a shot at goal which would have levelled the scores. The decision backfired with the Bulls' defensive line holding firm to deny the Rhinos their first major silverware in over 30 years. The cup final defeat did not appear to affect Leeds' Super League form as they established a commanding lead at the top of the table. In spite of this, it was announced in July 2003 that Powell would be moved into a director of rugby role the following season to make way for Tony Smith to take over as head coach. Following the announcement, the Rhinos form dipped and they surrendered their lead at the top of the table to the Bradford Bulls. They then crashed out of the play-offs without winning a game.

During his tenure as Rhinos coach, he handed debuts to numerous future club legends including Danny McGuire, Rob Burrow, Matt Diskin and Ryan Bailey. He also handed, a then 22-year old, Kevin Sinfield the captaincy. The group would go on to form the nucleus of the clubs famous "Golden generation".

Ireland
In 2004 Powell was coach for the Ireland national team. He helped to lead the team to the final of the 2004 European Nations Cup where they went down 36–12 to England.

Leeds Tykes
In July 2005 he made the switch to rugby union when he became the offensive coach and matchday manager for Leeds Tykes. In January 2006 he was promoted to head coach, but the season ended in disappointment when the Tykes were relegated.

Featherstone Rovers
He was appointed head coach of Featherstone Rovers in September 2008.

He oversaw one of the most successful periods in Featherstone Rovers' history, leading them to three consecutive Championship League Leaders' Shields and Grand Finals between 2010 and 2012. Despite winning the Championship Grand Final in 2011, Featherstone were not promoted to super league due to the controversial licensing system in place at the time. Subsequently, Powell continued to ply his trade in the second tier in 2012. In addition to again, leading the club to the 2012 league leaders shield and grand final, Powell also masterminded a famous victory over Super League side and local rivals Castleford in the Challenge Cup in what would prove to be his final season at the club.

Castleford Tigers
On 7 May 2013, Powell was announced as the new head coach of Featherstone Rovers' local rivals Castleford Tigers.

Powell was awarded the Coach of the Year award for 2014, after getting the club to their first Wembley appearance for twenty years and their highest league position since Super League began. He coached the club to the 2014 Challenge Cup Final defeat by the Leeds Rhinos at Wembley Stadium.

He oversaw arguably Castleford's greatest ever season in 2017 when they won the league leaders’ shield for the first time in their history. Despite finishing first in the regular season by a record margin, a first top flight title continued to allude Powell as the Tigers were defeated in the 2017 Super League Grand Final by the Leeds Rhinos at Old Trafford in a major upset.

On 19 March 2021, before the start of the delayed 2021 season, it was announced that Powell would leave Castleford Tigers at the end of the campaign, with early rumours linking him to Warrington Wolves, whose Head Coach Steve Price had also announced he would be leaving at the end of the 2021 campaign. Daryl Powell was announced as Warrington Wolves coach on 6 April 2021, taking over at the start of the 2022 season.

References

External links

Castleford Tigers profile
(archived by web.archive.org) Featherstone Rovers website
BBC – Daryl Powell
(archived by web.archive.org) Profile at leedsrugby
(archived by web.archive.org) When Britain defeated the Aussies

1965 births
Living people
Balmain Tigers players
Castleford Tigers coaches
England national rugby league team players
English rugby league coaches
English rugby league players
English rugby union coaches
Featherstone Rovers coaches
Gold Coast Chargers players
Great Britain national rugby league team players
Ireland national rugby league team coaches
Keighley Cougars coaches
Keighley Cougars players
Leeds Rhinos coaches
Leeds Rhinos players
Leeds Tykes coaches
People from Ackworth, West Yorkshire
Rugby league centres
Rugby league five-eighths
Rugby league locks
Rugby league players from Wakefield
Sheffield Eagles (1984) players
Warrington Wolves coaches